The 1981–82 Serie A season was won by Juventus.

Teams
Milan, Cesena and Genoa had been promoted from Serie B.

Final classification

Results

Top goalscorers

References and sources

External links

 :it:Classifica calcio Serie A italiana 1982 - Italian version with pictures and info.
  - All results on RSSSF Website.

Serie A seasons
Italy
1981–82 in Italian football leagues